Wilbur Lucius Cross (April 10, 1862 – October 5, 1948) was an American literary critic who served as the 71st governor of Connecticut from 1931 to 1939.

Biography
Born in 1862 in Mansfield, Connecticut, Cross attended Natchaug School in Willimantic, Connecticut. He graduated from Yale College (B.A. 1885) and served as principal of Staples High School in Westport, Connecticut for a short time around 1885 before returning to Yale as a graduate student, earning a PhD in English literature in 1889. Cross spent several years as a high school principal and schoolteacher at Staples High School in Westport before being offered a job as a professor of English at Yale in 1894. Over the next 36 years, he taught at Yale, became editor of the Yale Review, Sterling Professor of English in 1922, and Dean of the Yale Graduate School from 1916 to 1930. On July 17, 1889, he was married to Helen Baldwin Avery, and they had four children; Wilbur Lucius Cross, Jr., Avery Cross, Elizabeth Cross, and Arthur Cross.

Cross became a well-known literary critic. Along with C. F. Tucker Brooke, Cross was the editor of the Yale Shakespeare; he also edited the Yale Review for almost 30 years. He wrote several books, including Life and Times of Laurence Sterne (1909) and The History of Henry Fielding (1918), and several books on the English novel.

After retiring from Yale, Cross was elected governor of Connecticut as a Democrat in 1930 and served as Governor for four two-year terms, from January 7, 1931, to January 4, 1939. He was a Delegate to the Democratic National Convention from Connecticut in 1936. He was defeated in 1938 in his attempt to gain re-election for a fifth term. He is credited with passage of several items of reform legislation during his tenure of governor, which included measures related to the abolition of child labor, and instituted a minimum wage rate. Also there was legislation that authorized governmental reorganization, and improved factory laws. He also endorsed legislation that authorized funding for the rebuilding of the Connecticut State College, which included the construction of the first campus library, named the Cross Library.

During his tenure, eugenicist Harry H. Laughlin served on a commission proposing radical eugenic policies; these policies were never implemented.

After retiring from public service, he continued to stay active in his writing and research projects.

Death and legacy
Cross died on October 5, 1948, in New Haven, at the age of 86. He is interred at Evergreen Cemetery, New Haven, Connecticut.

Wilbur Cross High School in New Haven, Connecticut, Wilbur Cross School in Bridgeport, Connecticut, and Connecticut's Wilbur Cross Parkway and Wilbur Cross Highway were named in his honor, as was Yale's Wilbur L. Cross Medal, awarded for outstanding achievement in professional life. The first campus library at the University of Connecticut (then Connecticut State College), built with bond revenues authorized during Cross's governorship and opened in 1939, was named for Cross in 1942.

Wilbur Cross's autobiography, Connecticut Yankee, was published in 1943.

See also
 List of governors of Connecticut

Footnotes

Works

 Proclamations of His Excellency Wilbur L. Cross, Governor of the State of Connecticut. Hartford, CT: Prospect Press, 1937.
 Connecticut Yankee: An Autobiography. New Haven, CT: Yale University Press, 1943.

External links

Columbia Encyclopedia, Sixth Edition
Governor Cross Lent Name To Library
The Political Graveyard
Connecticut State Library
National Governors Association
Wilbur Lucius Cross papers (MS 155). Manuscripts and Archives, Yale University Library.

1862 births
1948 deaths
Democratic Party governors of Connecticut
Yale University faculty
Yale College alumni
Yale Sterling Professors
Yale Graduate School of Arts and Sciences alumni
Members of the American Academy of Arts and Letters